Nocardioides daecheongensis is a gram-positive, aerobic, non-spore-forming and non-motile bacterium from the genus Nocardioides that has been isolated from forest soil from Incheon on Daecheong Island, South Korea.

References

External links
Type strain of Nocardioides daecheongensis at BacDive -  the Bacterial Diversity Metadatabase	

daecheongensis
Bacteria described in 2014